The Common Chord is a 1947 short story collection by Frank O'Connor.

Stories
It features the following stories:

News For The Church
The Custom of the Country
Judas
The Holy Door
Don Juan, Retired
The Babes in the Wood
The Frying Pan
The Miracle
A Thing of Nothing
The Stepmother
Friends of the Family
Don Juan's Temptation

References

1947 short story collections
Short story collections by Frank O'Connor
Works by Frank O'Connor
Macmillan Publishers books